Muktha S. Sundar is an Indian film director and cinematographer who has worked on Tamil language films. Being the son of film maker Muktha Srinivasan, he made his directorial debut with  Kodai Mazhai (1986), before making the films, Chinna Chinna Aasaigal (1989), Ethir Kaatru (1990) and  Now Vedanta desika ha in sanskrit.

Career
Being the son of film director and producer Muktha Srinivasan, Sundar made his directorial debut under his father's production with  Kodai Mazhai (1986). Sundar had completed a course in cinematography at the American Film Institute and worked as the cinematographer for films including his father's productions Katha Nayagan (1988), Vaai Kozhuppu (1989) and Brahmachari (1992). He subsequently also directed the films Chinna Chinna Aasaigal (1989), Ethir Kaatru (1990) and Kangalin Vaarthaigal (1998) with Vikram in the lead role.

Sundar made a comeback to the film industry with the comedy thriller, Pathayeram Kodi'' (2013), featuring Dhruv Bhandari and Vivek in leading roles. The film began production in late 2011 and had a low-profile release in January 2013.

Sundar at present completed a movie vedanta desika ha 2018 in sanskrit featuring  Dushyanth Sridhar.

Filmography

References

External links

Living people
20th-century Indian film directors
Tamil-language film directors
Year of birth missing (living people)
21st-century Indian film directors